Micronesian broadbill may refer to:

 Guam flycatcher, an extinct species of bird formerly endemic to Guam
 Oceanic flycatcher, a species of bird found on the Caroline Islands
 Palau flycatcher, a species of bird endemic to Palau

Birds by common name